The Way of the Wolf is a 2000 role-playing game supplement for Legend of the Five Rings Roleplaying Game published by Alderac Entertainment Group.

Contents
The Way of the Wolf is a supplement in which the ronin class is detailed.

Reception
The Way of the Wolf was reviewed in the online second version of Pyramid which said "The good news is that while the format may be standard, Ronin, by their very nature are not. The different tales about Ronin in Chapter One give the GM a good idea of the numerous types of origins Ronin can have. Retired Samurai, Samurai out to test themselves, fallen Samurai, children of fallen Samurai, and farmers who want to be Samurai all move about under the broad title of Ronin."

Reviews
Backstab #24

References

Legend of the Five Rings Roleplaying Game
Role-playing game books
Role-playing game supplements introduced in 2000